is a professional squash player who represents Japan. He reached a career-high world ranking of World No. 149 in December 2012.

References

External links 
 
 

Japanese male squash players
Living people
1989 births
Squash players at the 2010 Asian Games
Squash players at the 2014 Asian Games
Asian Games competitors for Japan